Goldin Finance 117, also known as China 117 Tower (Chinese: 中国117大厦), is an unfinished skyscraper in Xiqing District, Tianjin, China. The tower was topped out in 2015 at a height of 597 m (1,959 ft). It has 128 storeys above ground, with 117 of them housing, hotel, and commercial space, which provides the source of the building’s name. Construction began in 2008 but was twice halted. , it remains unfinished and unoccupied.

Goldin Finance 117 and other failed skyscraper projects in China were responsible for the government banning construction of buildings over 500 metres (1,640 feet). If ever completed, Goldin Finance 117 will be China's last 500m+ tower for the foreseeable future.

Construction history
Construction of the skyscraper began in 2008 and was scheduled for completion in 2014. However, work was suspended in January 2010 due to the fallout of the Great Recession and eventually resumed in 2011 with the new estimated completion of 2018–2019. The building was topped out on 8 September 2015, making it the fifth-tallest building in the world at the time. 

It was originally meant to be the centerpiece in the Goldin Metropolitan Scheme, a mixed-use luxury development on the outskirts of Tianjin catering to the super-rich, although the economic viability of the project was questionable. The building's owner, Goldin Properties (a subsidiary of Goldin Financial Holdings Ltd.), ran into financial difficulties in the aftermath of the June 2015 Chinese stock market crash and was forced to suspend construction in December 2015. 

, the building remains unfinished and unoccupied. China State Construction Engineering Corporation, the contractor of the project, removed all on-site workers and left it unfinished. It is currently certified by Guinness World Records as the World's Tallest Unoccupied Building.

Design

Goldin Finance 117 is designed to resemble a walking stick, and has that as its nickname. Earlier designs resembled the shape of a fin and a diamond. Goldin Finance 117 is planned to be the main tower of Tianjin Goldin Metropolitan, a Central Business District funded by Goldin Properties, and would be built nearby the Tianjin Goldin Metropolitan Polo Club.

Urban exploration 
In 2015, two Russian and Chinese urban explorers climbed the tower and the construction crane.

In 2016, Russian couple Ivan Beerkus (Kuznetsov) and Angela Nikolau climbed the under-construction tower using stairs instead of the crane. Their video received over 880,000 views as of April 2020 and attracted worldwide media attention.

See also
List of tallest buildings in China
Suzhou Zhongnan Center
Wuhan Greenland Center
Baoneng Shenyang Global Financial Center
China Zun
Gezhouba International Plaza 1
Yantai Shimao No.1 The Harbour
Suzhou IFS
Tianjin Chow Tai Fook Binhai Center
Sino-Steel Tower
Ryugyong Hotel

References

External links
 

Buildings and structures under construction in China
2015 establishments in China
Skyscraper office buildings in Tianjin
Residential skyscrapers in China
Skyscraper hotels in Tianjin
Skyscrapers in Tianjin
Unfinished buildings and structures